The Fulton Street Line, also called the Fulton Street Elevated or Kings County Line, was an elevated rail line mostly in Brooklyn, New York City, United States. It ran above Fulton Street from Fulton Ferry, Brooklyn in Downtown Brooklyn east to East New York, and then south on Van Sinderen Avenue (southbound) and Snediker Avenue (northbound), east on Pitkin Avenue, north on Euclid Avenue, and east on Liberty Avenue to Ozone Park, Queens. 

The portion in Brooklyn has been torn down, but most of the line in Queens has been connected to the New York City Subway and is now part of the IND Fulton Street Line (a portion of the A and C), an underground line that replaced the elevated line in Brooklyn. The structure was the main line of the Kings County Elevated Railway, first opened in 1888.

History
The Kings County Elevated Railway opened the line, from dual western terminals at Fulton Ferry and Brooklyn Bridge (Sands Street) east to Nostrand Avenue, on April 24, 1888. Construction on this line started in the fall of 1885, when ground was broken at the corner of Fulton Street and Red Hook Lane. It was extended east to Albany Avenue on May 30, 1888; Albany Avenue was an eastbound-only station, and the westbound station just beyond at Sumner Avenue had yet to be completed, so it temporarily served both directions. The line was further extended to Ralph Avenue on September 20, 1888.

The Fulton Elevated Railroad was incorporated on July 6, 1888 to build a disconnected line from Greenpoint south through Williamsburg to Kent and Myrtle Avenues, and to extend the Kings County Elevated east beyond Rockaway Avenue to the city line. The former was not built, but construction soon began on the latter. The first piece, over Fulton Street and Williams Place, opened on July 4, 1889, connecting with the Long Island Rail Road's Manhattan Crossing station at the new terminal at Atlantic Avenue. 

It was extended further, over Snediker Avenue and Pitkin Avenue, to Van Siclen Avenue on November 18, 1889. Due to a shortage of wood for a storage yard, a temporary shuttle was operated between Pennsylvania Avenue and Van Siclen Avenue until mid-December. Construction above Pitkin Avenue progressed to Linwood Street on February 22, 1892 and Montauk Avenue on March 21, 1892. The line was completed to Grant Avenue at City Line on July 16, 1894, with the opening of a structure above Pitkin Avenue, Euclid Avenue, and Liberty Avenue.

The Kings County Elevated leased the Brooklyn and Brighton Beach Railroad on February 5, 1896. A two-block elevated connection between Franklin Avenue station and the Brighton Beach Line's Bedford station, including a new station at Dean Street, opened on August 15, 1896, and the Kings County Elevated began operating trains between the Brooklyn Bridge (Sands Street) and Brighton Beach.

The final extension, from Grant Avenue east to Lefferts Avenue, was built under the Dual Contracts and opened on September 25, 1915. In 1917 the Brooklyn Chamber of Commerce started fighting for the removal of the Fulton Street El. The Dual Contracts also triple-tracked the line as part of the Dual Contracts starting in 1913. The new third track went into operation on December 27, 1915, stretching between Manhattan Junction and Nostrand Avenue. Some trains ran express in the peak direction.

This also led to the reconstruction, replacement, and elimination of some stations. The Public Service Commission received a petition on December 9, 1916 from a large number of civic and business organizations to restrict the third tracking to a point in the vicinity of Cumberland Avenue.

In 1929, the Independent Subway System (IND) began planning their own Fulton Street subway immediately below the Elevated. The underground line was opened between Jay Street to Rockaway Avenue on April 9, 1936, including a stub terminal at Court Street. Stations west of Rockaway Avenue were being made obsolete as many were being replaced by the subway stations. Trains last ran on the line west of Rockaway Avenue on May 31, 1940, and these stations were closed the following day. The total cost of demolition of the Fulton Street Elevated was $2 million. 

On June 1, 1940 a free transfer was provided to the Fulton Street subway at Rockaway Avenue and a new "Fulton–Lexington Avenue" service via the Lexington Avenue Elevated west of East New York was introduced. The remainder of the line west of Hudson Street (now 80th Street) was closed on April 26, 1956, and Fulton Street subway trains began using the line east of Hudson Street on April 29.

Service patterns

The primary service pattern was a simple one-end-to-the-other operation, until May 31, 1940, when the 13 was cut back to Rockaway Avenue, and the BMT 12 took over operations from downtown Brooklyn to Lefferts Boulevard.

Station listing
Most Fulton Street trains left the line at Sands Street and ended at Park Row rather than Fulton Ferry.

References

Defunct New York City Subway lines
Brooklyn–Manhattan Transit Corporation
Railway lines opened in 1888
Railway lines closed in 1956